Ali Jan Faizi (born February 3, 1977) is an Afghan football player. He has played for Afghanistan national team.

National team statistics

External links

1977 births
Living people
Afghan footballers

Association football forwards
Afghanistan international footballers